

Commemorative drachma coins
Commemorative Greek drachma coins have been issued by the Bank of Greece throughout the 20th century. Early (1940–1967) coins were minted in Birmingham, Paris, Vienna, and Prague, but since 1978 all of Greece's commemorative coins have been minted in Athens.

1940 - restored monarchy
Commemorative coins of 1940 were minted to celebrate the five years of the restored Greek monarchy under King George II.
100 drachmas, silver and copper, George II of Greece, 25 November 1935
20 drachmas, gold and copper, George II of Greece, 25 November 1935
100 drachmas, gold and copper, George II of Greece, 25 November 1935

1963 - Centennial of the monarchy
30 drachmas, silver. The obverse depicts five kings of the House of Glücksburg, 1863–1963. Clockwise from the top: Paul, George II, Alexander, Constantine I and George I.

1964 - Royal Wedding
30 drachmas, silver (weight reduced from the 1963 coin). Commemorates the wedding of King Constantine II and Anne-Marie of Denmark. Obverse shows profiles of the couple, reverse the royal crowned double-headed eagle.

1970 - military junta
In 1970 the Greek junta regime issued a number of commemorative coins with the coup d'état of 1967 as a topic.
50 drachmas, silver and copper, phoenix, soldier, 21 April 1967
100 drachmas, silver and copper, phoenix, soldier, 21 April 1967
20 drachmas, gold and copper, phoenix, soldier, 21 April 1967
100 drachmas, gold and copper, phoenix, soldier, 21 April 1967

1978 - 50 years Bank of Greece
The Bank of Greece celebrated its 50th birthday with a commemorative coin in 1978.
100 drachmas, silver, Athena, Bank of Greece 50 years, 1928–1978

1979 - Greece enters the EEC
The coins issued in 1979 celebrating Greece's entry into the European Economic Community were the first ones to feature the modern version of the Greek plural δραχμές instead of δραχμαί.
500 drachmas, silver, the stealing of Europa
10,000 drachmas, gold, Amphiktyon

1981-82 - 14th Paneuropean games
Coins issued in 1981 and 1982 celebrated the 13th Paneuropean games, which were held in Athens in 1982. Although minted two years after the 1979 coin, all of these coins featured the old spelling δραχμαί again.

1981 - 1st set
100 drachmas, silver, ancient olympic long jump
250 drachmas, silver, ancient olympic javelin throw
500 drachmas, silver, ancient olympic stadion race
2,500 drachmas, gold, Hermes
5,000 drachmas, gold, Zeus

1982 - 2nd set
100 drachmas, silver, 1896 olympic high jump
250 drachmas, silver, 1896 olympic discus throw
500 drachmas, silver, 1896 olympic race
2500 drachmas, gold, Spiridon Louis
5000 drachmas, gold, Pierre De Coubertin

1982 - 3rd set
100 drachmas, silver, modern pole vault
250 drachmas, silver, modern shot put
500 drachmas, silver, modern race
2500 drachmas, gold, Eirene
5,000 drachmas, gold, doves flying

1984 - Los Angeles Olympic Games
Two commemorative coins were minted in 1984 to celebrate the XXIII Olympic Games in Los Angeles.
500 drachmas, silver, ancient olympic torchbearer
5,000 drachmas, gold, Apollo

1985 - U.N. Decade on the woman
In 1985 two coins were minted celebrating the United Nations Decade for women (1976–1985).
1,000 drachmas, silver, group of women
10,000 drachmas, gold, Nike

1988 - Chess olympiad in Thessaloniki
The 1988 coins were minted to honour the 28th Chess Olympiad in Thessaloniki.
100 drachmas, copper and nickel, chess olympiad emblem and the White Tower
500 drachmas, silver, chess olympiad emblem and ancient chess players

1990 - 50th anniversary 28 October 1940
The two coins minted in 1990 celebrate the 50th anniversary of the Italian invasion in Greece in World War II. The 28th of October is celebrated every year as a national holiday in Greece.
1,000 drachmas, silver, soldiers with horse, 28 October 1940
20,000 drachmas, gold, soldiers with horse, 28 October 1940

1991 - Mediterranean games in Athens
Two coins were minted in 1991 to celebrate the 11th Mediterranean Games, which were held in Athens that year.
500 drachmas, silver, dolphin
10,000 drachmas, gold, dolphin

1993 - 2500 years of democracy
An unusual anniversary, 2500 years of democracy, counting from Cleisthenes' democratic constitution of Athens of 508 BCE, was celebrated with two commemorative drachma coins in 1993.
500 drachmas, silver, demos, democracy
10,000 drachmas, gold, Pericles

1994 - Volleyball centennial
1994 saw the minting of two coins commemorating the 100 years since the creation of the game volleyball.
500 drachmas, silver, volleyball players
10,000 drachmas, gold, 100

1996 - Atlanta Olympic Games
The XXVI Olympic games in Atlanta were celebrated with the minting of three coins. Their common obverse shows the Kallimarmaro stadium in Athens.
1,000 drachmas, silver, ancient olympic stadion race
1,000 drachmas, silver, ancient olympic wrestling
20,000 drachmas, gold, ancient olympic javelin throw

2000 - Athens Olympic Games
Released for the upcoming 2004 XXVIII Olympic games to be held in Athens, these six 500 drachmas coins were produced in copper-nickel. Each had a mintage of 4,000,000. They could be purchased as complete sets. The obverse showed a victor's laurel crown. Reverse designs were as follows:
The 2004 Olympic Medal
Spyridon Louis
Baron Pierre de Coubertin
Diagoras of Rhodes
Kindling the Olympic flame at Olympia
The Stadium at Olympia

2000 - the last drachma
The last commemorative Greek drachma coin before the introduction of the euro was a gold version of the last single drachma circulation coin.
1 drachma, gold, Laskarina Bouboulina, ship

Commemorative Euro coins

External links

Bank of Greece

Greece